Andrew Cornell Robinson (born 1968) is an American artist and designer. He is based in New York City.

Career
Robinson's work spans various media from ceramics and painting to printmaking and sculpture. His work combines humor, history, and sculptural forms and transforms ceramics into a very contemporary medium. Robinson's sculpture explores memory and narrative through a sublime handling of materials and contrasts this with eccentric forms that touch upon personal and socio-political content through the use of craft and assemblage materials.

Robinson's work is in private and public collections and has been exhibited widely at galleries and museums such as David & Schwietzer Contemporary, Christopher Stout Gallery, Anna Kustera Gallery and Paul Sharpe Projects, Eyelevel BQE Gallery in New York City, and the Ross Museum in Ohio, Baltimore Contemporary Museum, Saint Joseph's University Gallery  and the Aldrich Museum of Art. His work has been featured in presentations by the Craft Council of the United Kingdom, Clay in the East at the Virginia Commonwealth University and the American Center for Design in Chicago.  He has written art criticism and essays for Sculpture Magazine, ArtCat, and The Gay City News. He was a founding member of the board of directors of the Foucault Society in the United States. He has received awards from Cannes for digital media work and fellowships from The Edward Albee Foundation in 2010.

His work has been the subject of reviews and essays by Frank Holliday, Hrag Vartanian and Zane Wilson.  Wilson wrote about Robinson's work "Andrew Robinson’s work overlaps themes of multiple cultures, sexual identity, an absence of historical presence, political awareness executed through careful nods to art history through the genuine invention of beautifully crafted objects."

He teaches at Parsons The New School for Design in New York City, where he is an Assistant Professor.

Early life and education
Born in 1968 in New Jersey, United States. Robinson studied at the Maryland Institute College of Art (MICA) in Baltimore, Maryland and received a B.F.A. in Ceramics in 1991. In 1994, he received a M.F.A. in Sculpture from the School of Visual Arts in New York City.

References

External links
 Andrew Cornell Robinson's Website
 Arts + Crafts Research Studio
 Interview in Maake Magazine
 Transgressing Across Time and Line, Art Spiel BY Etty Yaniv
 Video interview with Andrew Cornell Robinson at the Edward Albee Foundation
 Algo más…, an interview with Colour Me In
 Andrew Cornell Robinson, Presentation at the Crafts Council, London, UK, 2010
 ART CAT, Pick, 2010
 Andrew Cornell Robinson interviews Michelle Lopez
 Disobedience And Through The Night Softly: Andrew Cornell Robinson And Gregory Green At Anna Kustera, by Catherine Spaeth, Huffington Post, 20 December 2011
 Top Ten November shows in NYC, By Doug McClemont, Saatchi Online Magazine, November 15, 2011
 Andrew Cornell Robinson at Anna Kustera by Christopher Robbins, Contemporary Myth-making
 Assemble, Crafts Magazine Online, London, 2010
 Interview Andrew Cornell Robinson: Create or Else, New York, 2010

20th-century American sculptors
20th-century American male artists
American ceramists
Sculptors from New York (state)
Living people
American gay artists
Maryland Institute College of Art alumni
Parsons School of Design faculty
School of Visual Arts alumni
1968 births
21st-century American sculptors
21st-century American male artists
20th-century ceramists
21st-century ceramists
21st-century American LGBT people